The Experimental Advanced Superconducting Tokamak (EAST), internal designation HT-7U (Hefei Tokamak 7 Upgrade), is an experimental superconducting tokamak magnetic fusion energy reactor in Hefei, China. The Hefei Institutes of Physical Science is conducting the experiment for the Chinese Academy of Sciences. It has operated since 2006.

It is the first tokamak to employ superconducting toroidal and poloidal magnets. It aims for plasma pulses of up to 1,000 seconds.

Since China is a member of the international ITER project, it is hoped that EAST will provide new impetus for its further development.

History 

EAST followed China's first superconducting tokamak device, dubbed HT-7, built by the Institute of Plasma Physics in partnership with Russia in the early 1990s.

The project was proposed in 1996 and approved in 1998. According to a 2003 schedule, buildings and site facilities were to be constructed by 2003. Tokamak assembly was to take place from 2003 through 2005.

Construction was completed in March 2006 and on September 28, 2006, "first plasma" was achieved.

According to official reports, the project's budget is CNY ¥300 million (approximately US$37 million), some 1/15 to 1/20 the cost of a comparable reactor built in other countries.

Phase I 
On September 28, 2006, first plasma was achieved—the first test lasted nearly three seconds, and generated an electric current of 200 kiloamperes.

By Jan 2007 "the reactor created a plasma lasting nearly five seconds and generating an electric current of 500 kilo amperes".

On November 7, 2010, EAST achieved its first H-mode plasma by LHW alone.

In May 2011, EAST became the first tokamak to successfully sustain H-Mode plasma for over 30 seconds at ~50 million Kelvin.

Phase II 

On November 29, 2011, The ribbon-cutting ceremony for EAST auxiliary heating system project was held, signifying EAST's entering of “Phase-II”.

On May 19, 2014, after nearly 20-month-long upgrading break since September 2012, EAST was ready for the first round of experiments in 2014.

By May 2015, EAST was reporting 1 MA currents, and H-mode for 6.4 seconds.

In February, 2016, a plasma pulse was maintained for a record 102 seconds at ~50 million °C. Plasma current of 400kA and a density of about 2.4 x 1019/m3 with slowly increasing temperature.

On November 2, 2016, EAST became the first tokamak to successfully sustain H-Mode plasma for over a minute at ~50 million °C.

On July 3, 2017, EAST became the first tokamak to successfully sustain H-Mode plasma for over 100 seconds at ~50 million °C.

On November 12, 2018, EAST reached a milestone of 100 million °C electron temperature.

In May, 2021, EAST reached a milestone of 120 million °C electron temperature for 101 seconds.

On December 30, 2021, a long-pulse high-parameter plasma operation of 1056 seconds was realized, which once again created a new world record for the operation of the Tokamak experimental device.

Physics objectives 
China is a member of the ITER consortium, and EAST is a testbed for ITER technologies.

EAST was designed to test:

 Superconducting Niobium-titanium poloidal field magnets, making it the first tokamak with superconducting toroidal and poloidal magnets
 Non-inductive current drive
 Pulses of up to 102 seconds with 0.5 MA plasma current
 Schemes for controlling plasma instabilities through real-time diagnostics
 Materials for diverters and plasma facing components
 Operation with βN = 2 and confinement factor H89 > 2

Tokamak parameters

See also 

 ASDEX Upgrade
 China Fusion Engineering Test Reactor (CFETR)
 HL-2M
 List of fusion experiments
 ITER
 Joint European Torus
 JT-60
 KSTAR

References

External links 
  - Official website of EAST Fusion Facility - Chinese Academy of Science
 People's Daily article
 Xinhua article Mar 1 2006 - Note that EAST is not the "world's first experimental nuclear fusion device".
 Xinhua article Mar 24, 2006 Nuke fusion reactor completes test

Tokamaks
Buildings and structures in Hefei
Nuclear power in China

ur:مصنوعی سورج